The Twenty-seventh Amendment may refer to:
Twenty-seventh Amendment to the United States Constitution (1992), which prohibits changes to Congress members' salaries from taking effect until after an election of representatives.
Twenty-seventh Amendment of the Constitution of Ireland (2004), which abolished Irish citizenship by birth.
Constitution (Amendment No. 27) Act 1936, which amended the Constitution of the Irish Free State so as to abolish the office of Governor-General, and removed all direct references to the King.